Insomnia is a collaborative studio album by British rappers Skepta, Chip and Young Adz, released on 27 March 2020 by SKC M29. The album features a guest appearance by Dirtbike LB of D-Block Europe. It was promoted by the lead single, "Waze".

Release and promotion
The album was announced by the three artists on 22 March 2020 via social media, alongside the option to pre-order.

A music video for the lead single "Waze" was released on 25 March 2020.
A second music video for the track "Mains" was released on 1 April 2020.

Commercial performance
"Insomnia" debuted at number three on the UK Albums chart. The entry marked Skepta's third Top 10 album, Chip's third Top 10 album, and a first for solo Young Adz (fourth including his work with D-Block Europe).

Critical reception

At review aggregator Metacritic, which assigns a normalized rating out of 100 to reviews from mainstream publications, Insomnia received a weighted average score of 82, based on 6 reviews, indicating "universal acclaim".

Aimee Cliff of The Guardian wrote that Insomnia "feels calibrated for the current, strange cultural moment: it's immediately available, rides low at a tempo that's perfect for listening to while on lockdown in your house or car, and, with the title Insomnia, tackles paranoid themes with the light relief of dark humour". Kyann-Sian Williams of NME concluded that "Overall, though, despite a couple of subpar verses, Insomnia is one for the books. The UK rap world has never seen three of the scene's most in-demand rappers surprisingly team up for an album. Here the best of north and south London have come together and paved the way for others to follow suit". Joe Hale of Clash complimented the album's production and the chemistry between the three artists: "The three work well as a collective: Chip provides the cut-throat and fresh bars, Adz comes with the melody and Skepta is free to experiment throughout. The beats stand up too, consonantly switching patterns and breaks and bringing the best out of each artist".

Track listing

Notes
 "Insomnia Interlude" features additional vocals by Litty Brity and Greatness Dex.
 "High Road" features additional vocals by M.O. Thompson.

Sample credits
 "St Tropez" contains samples of "Paper Planes", written by Maya Arulpragasam, Wesley Pentz, Topper Headon, Mick Jones, Paul Simonon and Joe Strummer, and performed by M.I.A.

Charts

Release history

References

2020 albums
Skepta albums
Chipmunk (rapper) albums
Collaborative albums
Albums produced by Skepta
Albums produced by Cardo (record producer)